Tricyrtis is a genus of Asian flowering plants in the lily family, with approximately 20 known species. The species are commonly known in English as toad lilies. The genus has a native range from the Himalayas to eastern Asia, including China, Japan, Philippines and Taiwan, and a few species are cultivated for their ornamental qualities in other parts of the world.

Description
Tricyrtis are herbaceous perennials with creeping rhizomes. The stems are typically erect or maybe ascending, and sometimes branched from the middle to the top. The subsessile leaves are arranged alternately along the stems. The inflorescences are most commonly thyrse or thyrsoid, or rarely the flowers are arranged into a raceme. The showy, solitary flowers are bisexual. Perianth campanulate or trumpet-shaped with six free tepals arranged into two whorls: the outer whorl has nectar secreting pouches, while the inner whorl has upright tepals with dorsal crests. The tepals are white or yellow with purplish spots, usually recurved or reflexed. The six stamens are inserted at base of the tepals, and the filaments are slightly flattened, forming a short tube. The anthers are dorsifixed. The three-loculed ovary have many ovules per locule.  The styles are arranged into a column. The three-angled fruits are broadly cylindrical capsules and when ripe release many small, flat, ovate to orbicular shaped seeds.

Taxonomy 
The genus is subdivided into four sections, with about 20 species. Accepted species include:

Cultivation

Tricyrtis species are perennial herbaceous plants that grow at the edge of forests.  They prefer shade or part shade and rich, moist soil.  Toad lilies bloom in summer to fall. They are hardy enough to handle sudden changes of winter from mild to blustery cold.

See also

 List of plants known as lily

References

Bibliography 

 
 
 Diversity of Life: Tricyrtis - retrieved 6 June 2006

External links
 
 

 
Liliaceae genera